Lucía Parker Salomón (born January 29, 1983) is a Salvadoran singer-songwriter and Christian worship leader. She has been nominated for multiple Dove Awards, Latin Grammy Awards, and Arpa Awards.

Biography 
Lucia Parker was born on January 29, 1983, in El Salvador, is the daughter of a pastor. She is married to Jake Solomon and together they have two twins, they live in the city of Nashville, Tennessee.

Musical career 
After Parker was nominated for several awards for her work she traveled of El Salvador to the United States in 2009, she and her husband traveled throughout Latin America and the United States while serving as a worship leader for some churches. Lucia joined other singers of Contemporary worship music, Aline Barros, Israel and New Breed, and Planetshakers to record musical projects in Spanish and Portuguese. In 2014 Lucia Parker released the album Rey De Mi Universo, the album debuted at No. 18 on the Billboard "Latin Pop Albums" chart. In 2015 Lucia recorded the song "Me Amaste a Mí" feat. Christine D'Clario, also collaborate in the translation of the song "En el Trono Está", originally composed in English by Jon Egan, Jason Ingram and Kari Jobe for the album Eterno Live. In 2017 he released the album REVIVE in Spanish and English with songs of praise and worship it also has the collaboration of Israel Houghton. In 2021 Lucia collaborated with her voice for the song Fe Y Asombro that Meredith Andrews released for the EP Faith And Wonder (Alternative Versions) and for the album Ábrenos Los Cielos.

Discography 
Most of the music albums have been released through the Bridge Music Label distributed by Provident Music Group.

 2003: En Lo Secreto 
 2008: Alabanza y Adoración del Corazón
 2008: Regalo de Navidad
 2010: Christmas: A Love Story
 2010: Navidad: Una Historia de Amor
 2011: Everlasting Love
 2014: Rey De Mi Universo
 2017: Revive
 2017: Revive (Spanish)

Awards and nominations 

In 2009 Lucia Parker won a Arpa Awards (México, 2014) in the category: Best Christian Album (in Spanish) for the album Alabanza Y Adoración: Del Corazón.

In 2009 Lucía Parker was nominated for the 10th Annual Latin Grammy Awards in the category: Best Christian Album (in Spanish) for the album Alabanza Y Adoración: Del Corazón.

In 2014 Lucía Parker was nominated for the Premios ARPA (México, 2014) in the category: Album of the year for the album Rey De Mi Universo, won a Arpa Awards (México, 2014) in the Best Music Video category and Best Song in Participation: "Cielos De Color" featuring Israel Houghton and Redimi2.

In 2018 Lucía Parker was nominated for the Arpa Awards in the category: Best Female Vocal Album for the album Revive (Spanish).

References 

Living people
Musicians from Tennessee
Christian music songwriters
Performers of contemporary worship music
Women singer-songwriters
Christians from Tennessee
Spanish-language singers of the United States
1983 births